Upper Mount Bethel Township is a township in Northampton County, Pennsylvania. The population of Upper Mount Bethel Township was 6,706 at the 2010 census. The township is part of the Lehigh Valley metropolitan area, which had a population of 861,899 and was the 68th most populous metropolitan area in the U.S. as of the 2020 census.

History
Old Mount Bethel was one of the oldest settled areas in Northampton County. Included within in its jurisdiction was the Old Hunter Settlement, founded by the Ulster Scotts around 1730. The same year, Old Mount Bethel was erected a town. After the Walking Purchase of 1737 between the William Penn family and the Lenape Delaware Indian tribes was completed, Old Mount Bethel was established in Bucks County. In 1752, Bucks County was divided and Northampton County was established, placing Old Mount Bethel within the boundaries of Northampton County.

Geography
It is drained by the Delaware River, which forms its eastern boundary separating it from New Jersey. Its natural northwestern boundary is Blue Mountain. Its villages include Centerville, Five Points, Hartzells Ferry, Johnsonville, Mount Bethel, North Bangor, and Slateford.

Neighboring municipalities
Washington Township (southwest)
East Bangor (southwest)
Lower Mount Bethel Township (south)
Belvidere, New Jersey (southeast)
White Township, New Jersey (east)
Knowlton Township, New Jersey (east)
Portland (east)
Delaware Water Gap, Monroe County (north)
Smithfield Township, Monroe County (north)
Stroud Township, Monroe County (north)
Hamilton Township, Monroe County (northwest)

Demographics

As of the census of 2000, there were 6,063 people, 2,363 households, and 1,732 families residing in the township. The population density was 139.7 people per square mile (54.0/km2). There were 2,574 housing units at an average density of 59.3/sq mi (22.9/km2). The racial makeup of the township was 97.89% White, 0.69% African American, 0.13% Native American, 0.49% Asian, 0.21% from other races, and 0.58% from two or more races. Hispanic or Latino of any race were 1.39% of the population.

There were 2,363 households, out of which 28.8% had children under the age of 18 living with them, 63.4% were married couples living together, 6.1% had a female householder with no husband present, and 26.7% were non-families. 21.7% of all households were made up of individuals, and 8.9% had someone living alone who was 65 years of age or older. The average household size was 2.56 and the average family size was 2.96.

In the township, the population was spread out, with 22.8% under the age of 18, 6.2% from 18 to 24, 28.3% from 25 to 44, 26.8% from 45 to 64, and 15.9% who were 65 years of age or older. The median age was 41 years. For every 100 females, there were 100.8 males. For every 100 females age 18 and over, there were 100.6 males.

The median income for a household in the township was $45,617, and the median income for a family was $54,692. Males had a median income of $38,914 versus $23,906 for females. The per capita income for the township was $21,116. About 4.6% of families and 6.3% of the population were below the poverty line, including 3.3% of those under age 18 and 15.7% of those age 65 or over.

Transportation

Pennsylvania Route 191, Pennsylvania Route 512 and Pennsylvania Route 611 are the numbered highways serving Upper Mount Bethel Township. PA 191 follows a north-south alignment across the western portion of the township. PA 512 follows an east-west alignment through the middle of the township. PA 611 follows a north-south alignment across the eastern portion of the township.

Public education
The township is served by Bangor Area School District. Students in grades nine through 12 attend Bangor Area High School in Bangor.

Notable people
Johann Adam Eyer, fraktur artist

References

External links
Official website

External links

Upper Mount Bethel Township

Pennsylvania populated places on the Delaware River
Townships in Northampton County, Pennsylvania
Townships in Pennsylvania